Porphyromonas cangingivalis  is a bacterium from the genus of Porphyromonas which occur in the periodontal pockets of dogs. Porphyromonas cangingivalis can cause periodontitis in animals

References

External links
Type strain of Porphyromonas cangingivalis at BacDive -  the Bacterial Diversity Metadatabase

Bacteroidia
Bacteria described in 1994